Catalina Diaz Vilchis (born 30 April 1964), a Mexican weightlifter, specialized in Powerlifting.
She won the bronze medal at the 2016 Summer Paralympics held in Rio de Janeiro. She also participated in the 2004 Summer Olympics in Athens.

Biography
Catalina started practicing weightlifting when she was 21 years old within the Sistema Nacional para el Desarrollo Integral de la Familia in Mexico city. her disability was caused by Poliomyelitis. Catalina was inspired by Eduardo Nájera, Michael Jordan and Ana Gabriela Guevara.

Sport career 
At the 2016 Summer Paralympics, held in Rio de Janeiro, she managed to lift 117 kg in the 86 kg category, enough to earn the bronze medal by one kilogram. While in Athens 2004, she won the bronze medal; she lift 110 kg in the 67.5 kg category.

References

1964 births
Living people
Medalists at the 2004 Summer Paralympics
Medalists at the 2016 Summer Paralympics
Paralympic medalists in powerlifting
Paralympic bronze medalists for Mexico
Powerlifters at the 2004 Summer Paralympics
Powerlifters at the 2016 Summer Paralympics
Paralympic powerlifters of Mexico
Medalists at the 2011 Parapan American Games
Medalists at the 2015 Parapan American Games
People with polio
Women members of the Chamber of Deputies (Mexico)
Deputies of the LXV Legislature of Mexico
21st-century Mexican women politicians